Anne Forrester Holloway (June 2, 1941 – June 23, 2006) was an American diplomat who held offices with the United States Department of State and the United Nations. From 1979 to 1981, she served as United States Ambassador to Mali.

Career
Prior to serving as the US Ambassador to Mali, Holloway had been staff director for Andrew Young, when he was United States Ambassador to the United Nations.  From 1985 to her retirement in October 2001, she worked for the U.N. in various capacities: with the United Nations Development Programme (UNDP); with the United Nations Regional Bureau for Africa, and with the United Nations Foundation. Following her retirement from the UN, she worked as a senior policy advisor for Rep. Juanita Millender-McDonald (D-CA) for a year, then as a consultant on African and Caribbean development issues.

In her earlier days, she was the first managing editor of Drum and Spear Press.

Family life
She was born about 1941 in Philadelphia, Pennsylvania and died June 23, 2006 in New York, New York. She married Marvin Holloway (they later divorced).  They had two daughters.

References

External links
 Washington Post obituary
 U.S Department of State Office of the Historian

1941 births
2006 deaths
Ambassadors of the United States to Mali
Scientists from Philadelphia
American officials of the United Nations
American women political scientists
American political scientists
Bennington College alumni
Howard University alumni
American women ambassadors
20th-century American women
20th-century American people
21st-century American women
20th-century political scientists